Travis Taylor (born April 25, 1990) is an American professional basketball player for Bakken Bears of the Basketligaen. He played college basketball for Monmouth and later Xavier.

Career
After going undrafted at the 2013 NBA draft, Taylor joined the Austrian club Güssing Knights where he played for the next two seasons.

On July 3, 2015, he signed with the French club STB Le Havre. On November 19, 2015, he parted ways with Le Havre after appearing in seven league games and three FIBA Europe Cup games. In February 2016, he signed with Hungarian club Soproni KC for the rest of the 2015–16 NB I/A season.

On August 23, 2016, he signed with Fribourg Olympic for the 2016–17 Championnat LNA season.

In July 2017, he signed with Bulgarian club Rilski Sportist for the 2017–18 season.

On August 3, 2018, he has signed with Löwen Braunschweig of the Basketball Bundesliga.

On December 2, 2018, he has signed with Bandırma Kırmızı of the Turkish Basketball First League.

On July 28, 2019, he has signed with Egis Körmend of the NB I/A.

On August 12, 2021, he has signed with Bakken Bears of the Basketligaen.

Honours and titles

Club
Güssing Knights
2× Österreichische Basketball Bundesliga: 2013–14, 2014–15
Austrian Cup: 2015
Rilski Sportist
 Bulgarian Cup: 2018

Individual
 ÖBL Most Valuable Player: 2014–15

References

1990 births
Living people
American expatriate basketball people in Austria
American expatriate basketball people in Bulgaria
American expatriate basketball people in France
American expatriate basketball people in Hungary
American expatriate basketball people in Switzerland
American men's basketball players
Basketball players from New Jersey
BC Rilski Sportist players
Fribourg Olympic players
Monmouth Hawks men's basketball players
Österreichische Basketball Bundesliga players
People from Irvington, New Jersey
People from Union Township, Union County, New Jersey
Power forwards (basketball)
Soproni KC players
Sportspeople from Essex County, New Jersey
Sportspeople from Union County, New Jersey
STB Le Havre players
Union High School (New Jersey) alumni
Xavier Musketeers men's basketball players